The 4th South American Under-23 Championships in Athletics were held in Medellín, Colombia, at the Estadio Alfonso Galvis Duque at the Unidad Deportiva Atanasio Girardot on March 20–23, 2010.  The championships, organized by CONSUDATLE, were held as a part of the South American Games (organized by ODESUR).  A detailed report on the results was given.  The most prominent result was achieved in the heat of the women's 100 metres by Ana Cláudia Lemos Silva. Her time of 11.17 (wind: 1.4 m/s) equaled the South American and Brazilian record, and set a new championships and games record.

Participation

13 countries participated in the Under-23 Championships. 12 countries: Argentina, Bolivia, Brazil, Chile, Colombia, Ecuador, Guyana, Paraguay, Perú, Suriname, Uruguay, and  Venezuela competed in both the South American Games and in the Under-23 Championships. Panamá competed only in the Under-23 Championships, but did not register for the athletics section of the South American Games.
The Netherlands Antilles are only member of ODESUR, but not of CONSUDATLE.  Their athletes participated in the South American Games, but acted as guest athletes in the South American Under-23 Championships.

Medal summary
Medal winners are published.
Detailed results can be found on the website of Todor Krastev, and on the Tilastopaja website.

Men

* Jhamal Bowen from Panamá, won the silver medal in the men's long jump event of the South American Under-23 Championships.  However, he was not eligible for gaining a medal at the South American Games, because Panamá did not register for the athletics section of the games.

Women

†: The women's 10.000 metres competition was not part of the South American Games, because the minimum number of 4 participating nations was not reached.

Doping

**Karina Villazana from Perú who initially was listed as winner of the women's 10,000 metres event (in 36:48.53) and as silver medalist
in the women's 5,000 metres event (in 17:24.31) was disqualified for violating the doping rules by being tested positive for cocaine abuse.

***Alison Sánchez from Bolivia was tested positive for nandrolone. Therefore, the Bolivian 4 x 400 metres relay team where she competed together with Lindy Carla Cavero Garcia, Marysabel Romero Lea Plaza, and Leslie Fernanda Arnez Rivero, lost its bronze medal (in 3:51.04) to Argentina.

Medal table (unofficial)

Team trophies

Brazil won the overall team trophy of the South American Under-23 Championships for the 4th time in the role, and additionally the team trophy in the women category.  Colombia won the team trophy in the men category for the first time.  The number of points from the unofficial count from below based on the published results settled, i.e. by the disqualifications, differ somewhat from those published, without any influence on the order.

Total

Male

Female

References

2010
2010 in Colombian sport
South American U23
2010 in South American sport
International athletics competitions hosted by Colombia
2010 in youth sport